Season five of Dancing with the Stars premiered on September 24, 2007 with a special three-night premiere week, on the ABC network. As with previous seasons, CTV Television Network aired the series in Canada.

On November 27, 2007, Indy 500 driver Hélio Castroneves and Julianne Hough were crowned the champions, while Spice Girls singer Mel B and Maksim Chmerkovskiy finished in second place, and entertainer Marie Osmond and Jonathan Roberts finished third.

Cast

Couples
On August 29, 2007, the celebrity cast was announced on Good Morning America by host Tom Bergeron, judge Carrie Ann Inaba, and reigning celebrity champion Apolo Anton Ohno.

Future appearances
Hélio Castroneves and Sabrina Bryan returned for the All-Stars season, where Castroneves was paired with Chelsie Hightower and Bryan was paired with Louis van Amstel.

Hosts and judges
The show was co-hosted by Tom Bergeron and Samantha Harris, with Len Goodman, Bruno Tonioli, and Carrie Ann Inaba returning as judges. Samantha Harris gave birth on September 23, 2007. During her leave of absence, season two champion Drew Lachey filled in as co-host. Harris returned to the show on October 15.

Scoring charts

Notes

 : This was the lowest score of the week.
 : This was the highest score of the week.
 :  This couple finished in first place.
 :  This couple finished in second place.
 :  This couple finished in third place.
 :  This couple was in the bottom two, but was not eliminated.
 :  This couple was eliminated.

Highest and lowest scoring performances 
The highest and lowest performances in each dance according to the judges' 30-point scale are as follows.

Couples' highest and lowest scoring dances
Scores are based upon a potential 30-point maximum.

Weekly scores
Individual judges' scores in the charts below (given in parentheses) are listed in this order from left to right: Carrie Ann Inaba, Len Goodman, Bruno Tonioli.

Week 1 
Each couple performed either the cha-cha-cha or the foxtrot. The men performed on the first night and the women on the second. Couples are listed in the order they performed.
Night 1 - Women

Night 2 - Men

Week 2 
Each couple performed either the mambo or the quickstep. Couples are listed in the order they performed.

Week 3 
Each couple performed either the jive or the tango. Couples are listed in the order they performed.

Week 4 
Each couple performed either the paso doble or the Viennese waltz. Couples are listed in the order they performed.

Week 5 
Each couple performed either the rumba or the samba. Couples are listed in the order they performed.

Week 6 
Each couple performed one unlearned dance, and a group rock and roll dance. Couples are listed in the order they performed.

Week 7 
Each couple performed two unlearned dances. Couples are listed in the order they performed.

Week 8 
Each couple performed two unlearned dances. Couples are listed in the order they performed.

Week 9 
Each couple performed two dance styles already performed earlier in the season. Couples are listed in the order they performed.

Week 10 
On the first night, each couple performed a dance style already performed earlier in the season, and a freestyle. On the second night, the two remaining couples performed their favorite dance of the season.

Night 1

Night 2

Dance chart 
The celebrities and professional partners danced one of these routines for each corresponding week:
 Week 1: One unlearned dance (cha-cha-cha or foxtrot)
 Week 2: One unlearned dance (mambo or quickstep)
 Week 3: One unlearned dance (jive or tango)
 Week 4: One unlearned dance (paso doble or Viennese waltz)
 Week 5: One unlearned dance (rumba or samba)
 Week 6: One unlearned dance & group rock and roll dance
 Week 7: Two unlearned dances
 Week 8: Two unlearned dances
 Week 9: Two dances
 Week 10 (Night 1): Redemption dance & freestyle
 Week 10 (Night 2): Favorite dance of the season

Notes

 :  This was the highest scoring dance of the week.
 :  This was the lowest scoring dance of the week.
 :  This couple danced, but received no scores.

References

External links 

Dancing with the Stars (American TV series)
2007 in American television
2007 American television seasons